Alberto Ghirardi (5 May 1921 – 5 December 1987) was an Italian racing cyclist. He rode in the 1950 Tour de France.

References

External links
 

1921 births
1987 deaths
Italian male cyclists
Place of birth missing
People from Alessandria
Sportspeople from the Province of Alessandria
Cyclists from Piedmont